Andy Murray was the defending champion, but chose not to participate that year.

First-seeded Andy Roddick won in the final 6–4, 7–5, against Radek Štěpánek.

Seeds

Draw

Finals

Top half

Bottom half

External links
 Main draw
 Qualifying draw

Singles
2008 ATP Tour